is a Japanese professional footballer who plays as a right-back for Gamba Osaka.

References

External links

1996 births
Living people
Japanese footballers
Association football defenders
FC Gifu players
Gamba Osaka players
J1 League players
J2 League players
J3 League players